Stony Point High School is a high school in the Round Rock Independent School District (RRISD) in Round Rock, Texas, United States.

References

External links
 
TEA Rating

Round Rock Independent School District
High schools in Williamson County, Texas
Public high schools in Texas